Eugene Elwood Heeter is an American former college and professional football player.  Born  April 19, 1941 in Windber, Pennsylvania, he played tight end at West Virginia University, and professionally in the American Football League for the New York Jets from 1963 through 1965.  On September 12, 1964, he scored the first-ever touchdown in Flushing's Shea Stadium , catching a 16-yard pass from Dick Wood against the Denver Broncos.
Heeter was inducted into the Suffolk Sports Hall of Fame on Long Island in the Football Category with the Class of 2016.

See also 
Other American Football League players

External links 
https://www.pro-football-reference.com/players/HeetGe00.htm
https://web.archive.org/web/20070930094151/http://www.databasefootball.com/players/playerpage.htm?ilkid=HEETEGEN01

1941 births
Living people
Sportspeople from Johnstown, Pennsylvania
American football tight ends
Players of American football from Pennsylvania
West Virginia Mountaineers football players
New York Jets players
American Football League players
People from Windber, Pennsylvania